The list of ship commissionings in 1785 includes a chronological list of all ships commissioned in 1785.


See also

References 

1785
Ship commissionings